Frank Pilkington Sargeant (born 12 September 1932) is a retired Anglican bishop.

Educated at Boston Grammar School, the University of Durham and Cranmer Hall, he was ordained in 1961 and began his ministry with a curacy at Gainsborough. Following this he was priest in charge of St Martin's Grimsby, Vicar of North Hykeham, a residentiary canon of Bradford Cathedral, then Archdeacon of Bradford before ordination to the episcopate as Bishop of Stockport. His last post was as Bishop at Lambeth, a non-diocesan appointment to be head of the Archbishop of Canterbury’s staff. In retirement he is an honorary assistant bishop (primarily) in the Diocese of Manchester.

References

1932 births
Living people
People educated at Boston Grammar School
Archdeacons of Bradford
Bishops of Stockport
Bishops at Lambeth
Alumni of Cranmer Hall, Durham
20th-century Church of England bishops